The Pavelló de la Vall d'Hebron is an indoor venue located in Barcelona, Spain.  The building was completed in 1991 for the Games.

For the 1992 Summer Olympics, it hosted the basque pelota demonstration and the volleyball preliminaries.

For the 1992 Summer Paralympics, it hosted goalball, a team sport designed specifically for athletes with a vision impairment.

References
1992 Summer Olympics official report.  Volume 2. pp. 242–5.

Sports venues completed in 1991
Venues of the 1992 Summer Olympics
Olympic volleyball venues
Indoor arenas in Catalonia
Sports venues in Barcelona
Volleyball venues in Spain
1991 establishments in Spain
Badminton venues